Penny Ann Early (born May 30, 1943) is an American athlete who achieved two notable firsts in her lifetime as she was the first female jockey to be licensed to ride parimutuel horse races, and the first woman ever to play in a professional men's basketball league during the 1960s.

Life
Penny Early became notable as one of the first licensed female jockeys in the United States in 1968. In protest, male jockeys unanimously refused to ride in the first few races in which she was slated to compete at the Churchill Downs in Louisville, Kentucky to prevent her from competing.

In the midst of this heated controversy the Kentucky Colonels of the American Basketball Association signed Early to a short-term contract to play basketball for the men's team. Early had not played basketball at any level in life. Standing at just 5'3" tall and weighing a mere 112 pounds, she was also the smallest pro basketball player ever to compete. Management, including Colonels owners Joseph and Mamie Gregory, ordered coach Gene Rhodes to play Early in a game. Rhodes was not overly cooperative and protested to management.

Penny's moment came on Wednesday, November 27, 1968, against the Los Angeles Stars. Wearing a miniskirt and a turtleneck sweater with a number 3 on the back (to represent the three boycotted races at Churchill Downs), Early warmed up with the players during pre-game and sat on the bench with the team.

During the first half of play, during a timeout, Coach Rhodes sent Early to the scorer's table, where she officially checked into the game. In the Kentucky backcourt she took the ball out of bounds and inbounded it to teammate Bobby Rascoe. He then quickly called a timeout and the Colonels removed Early from the game to a mix of cheers and booing from the crowd of 5,345. Afterward, she signed hundreds of autographs to adoring onlookers making history once again.

ABA statistics

Regular season

|-
| style="text-align:left" | 
| style="text-align:left;"| Kentucky (ABA)
| 1 || - || 0.0 ||.000 || .000 || .000 || 0.0 || 0.0 || - || - || 0.0

Later life
Penny Ann was so frustrated with maintaining her weight and getting enough mounts that she quit to become a trainer. In 1974, at the age of 30, she went on a strict diet and worked diligently to get her weight down; however, her comeback was short-lived when she broke her arm, ankle, wrist, and some ribs in a racing spill. Today Early continues to work with horses in California and later in 2021 in Shelbyville, Tennessee.

References

1943 births
Living people
American women's basketball players
American female jockeys
Kentucky Colonels players
Place of birth missing (living people)
21st-century American women